Aderpas griseotinctus is a species of beetle in the family Cerambycidae. It was described by Hunt and Breuning in 1955.

References

Aderpasini
Beetles described in 1955
Taxa named by Stephan von Breuning (entomologist)